Graeme Lourens van Buuren (born 22 August 1990) is a South African-born English cricketer who plays for Gloucestershire. In March 2022, he was appointed the captain of the team for first-class and List A matches ahead of the 2022 domestic season. He initially qualified to play in English county cricket due to his British spouse, but was granted British citizenship in December 2021.

In April 2022, he was bought by the Birmingham Phoenix for the 2022 season of The Hundred.

References

External links
 

1990 births
Living people
English cricketers 
South African cricketers
Titans cricketers
Cricketers from Pretoria
Gloucestershire cricket captains 
Gloucestershire cricketers
South African emigrants to the United Kingdom
English sportspeople of South African descent
Birmingham Phoenix cricketers